Westwood Woodland Park is a   Local Nature Reserve in Southampton in Hampshire. It is owned by Hampshire County Council and managed by Hampshire County Council and Southampton City Council.

In the Middle Ages this park was part of the estate of Netley Abbey. Its habitats include ancient woodland, with haze coppice and oaks, streams, ponds, marshes and grassland. There are several rare beetles, and birds include barn owls, skylarks, linnets and meadow pipits.

References

Local Nature Reserves in Hampshire